Khnyukh is a rural locality (a selo) in Rutulskoye Rural Settlement, Rutulsky District, Republic of Dagestan, Russia. The population was 61 as of 2010. There is 1 street.

Geography 
It is located on the southern slope of the Samur ridge, 5 km north of Rutul.

Nationalities 
Rutuls live there.

References 

Rural localities in Rutulsky District